Churk Muzan (also Romanized as Chūrk Mūzān; also known as Chūrkeh Mūzan) is a village in Shanderman Rural District, Shanderman District, Masal County, Gilan Province, Iran. At the 2006 census, its population was 26, in 6 families.

References 

Populated places in Masal County